"The Games We Play" is a song by Pusha T.

Film and TV
 "The Games We Play" (13 July 2003) Where the Heart Is (UK TV series)
"The Games We Play", short by Annika Marks with Thomas Sadoski

Music
"The Games We Play", song by Andreas Johnson from Liebling (album) and compilation The Collector (album)
"The Games We Play", song by The Hollies from Evolution (The Hollies album)
"The Games We Play", song by Anekdoten from Gravity (Anekdoten album) 2003